The Wahoo Project Group is a multinational and multi-discipline marine salvage group formed to search for and identify the USS Wahoo (SS-238). Established in 1995 by a relative of the Wahoo's famed skipper Dudley Morton, the group claimed ultimate success when the Wahoo was positively located in 2006.

External links
USS Wahoo Project Group home page

Marine salvage operations